Inurement may refer to:
 Inurement, or desensitization in psychology
 Private inurement, the illegal use of one's influence over a non-profit organization for personal profit